Piero Marini (born 13 January 1942) is a Roman Catholic archbishop who is president of the Pontifical Committee for International Eucharistic Congresses. For twenty years he served as Master of Pontifical Liturgical Celebrations, in charge of the Office for the Liturgical Celebrations of the Supreme Pontiff. In that capacity he worked for Popes John Paul II for 18 years and Benedict XVI for two years.

Biography
Marini was born in Valverde, Italy, and was ordained a priest of the Catholic Church on 27 June 1965. He holds a doctorate in liturgy from the Benedictine-run College of Sant'Anselmo.

In 1975, Marini became personal secretary to Archbishop Annibale Bugnini, the chief architect of the liturgical reforms that followed Vatican II. From 1987 to 2007, Marini was the Master of the Office for the Liturgical Celebrations of the Supreme Pontiff, the group responsible for organizing the details of papal liturgies and other celebrations. He was seen at the pope's side in every such celebration. He was appointed Titular Bishop of Martirano on 14 February 1998 and was consecrated on 19 March by Pope John Paul II. On 29 September 2003 he was raised to the rank of archbishop.

On 1 October 2007, after Marini had served twenty years as Master, Pope Benedict appointed him president of the Pontifical Committee for International Eucharistic Congresses. He was confirmed to another five-year term in that post by Pope Francis on 10 March 2015. 

Three days after the death of Pope John Paul II in April 2005, Marini published a guide to the rites and decision-making authority during the weeks until the election of a new pope.

In April 2013, in an interview with the Costa Rican newspaper La Nacion, Marini indicated his openness to the idea of same-sex civil unions being recognised by civil law: "In these discussions, it is necessary, for example, to recognize the union of people of the same sex, because there are many couples who suffer because their civil rights are not recognized", but went on to say, "What cannot be recognized is that that couple be a marriage." He also expressed enthusiasm for the newly elected Pope Francis: "It's a breath of fresh air; it’s opening a window onto springtime and onto hope. We had been breathing the waters of a swamp and it had a bad smell. We’d been in a church afraid of everything, with problems such as Vatileaks and the paedophilia scandals. With Francis we’re talking about positive things.... there’s a different air of freedom, a church that’s closer to the poor and less problematic".

He was confirmed for another five-year term as a member of the Congregation for the Oriental Churches in February 2014 and has headed its committee for liturgy. He was named a member of the Congregation for Divine Worship and the Discipline of the Sacraments in October 2016.

During the night of 30/31 October 2016, he suffered a stroke.

On 18 May 2020, Marini concelebrated Mass with Pope Francis for the 100th anniversary of the birth of John Paul II. The Mass was celebrated ad orientem at John Paul's tomb in St. Peter's Basilica.

Activity as liturgist
Marini promoted Vatican II reforms including the "simplification of rites that he believes facilitates active participation." He supports the integration of local customs into church rituals. At a celebration he oversaw in 1998, a group of scantily clad Pacific Islanders danced during the opening liturgy of the Synod for Oceania in St. Peter's Basilica; Pope John Paul II's visit to Mexico City in 2002, an indigenous Mexican shaman performed a purification ritual on the pope during Mass.

In July 2007, when Pope Benedict gave broader permission for the celebration of the 1962 Tridentine Mass, Marini said that it "does not intend to introduce modifications into the current Roman Missal nor to express a negative judgement on the liturgical reform desired by the Council" and described it as "a gesture at the service of unity". Marini has said he is "not nostalgic for what he regards as the repetitive nature of the old Mass, neither the exaltation of the celebrant to the detriment of the people of God; and he deplores the marked split between the priest and the assembly."

When leaving his post at the Office of Liturgical Celebrations, he described his relationship with Pope Benedict XVI:

Marini's study of the Council's liturgical work appeared in English in 2007.

On 7 April 2017, he celebrated Mass in the Roman church where Paul VI first celebrated Mass in the vernacular at the conclusion of the Council fifty years earlier.

References

External links

Salt and Light TV: "Witness Archbishop Piero Marini" 3 February 2013
CBC The National: Archbishop Piero Marini interview 12 March 2013

1942 births
Liturgists
Living people
Pontifical Atheneum of St. Anselm alumni
21st-century Italian Roman Catholic titular archbishops
Members of the Congregation for the Oriental Churches
Members of the Congregation for Divine Worship and the Discipline of the Sacraments